Joshua McPake (born 31 August 2001) is a Scottish professional footballer who plays as a winger for Queen's Park, on loan from Rangers.

Club career

Rangers

Early career
A youth product of Rangers who was their Academy Player of the Year for 2018–19 having won the SPFL Reserve League, the Under-18 League and the Scottish Youth Cup in that season plus the Glasgow Cup in the prior campaign, McPake signed a new contract on 10 July 2019, which will keep him at the club until the summer of 2022. A week later he made his debut in a qualifying match against Gibraltese St Joseph's at Ibrox, coming on as a 67th minute substitute for Greg Docherty.

Loan spells
On 20 August 2019, McPake joined Scottish Championship side Dundee on a loan until the following January. After an ankle injury hindered his progress with the Dark Blues, McPake spent the last few weeks of his loan spell back at Rangers, and officially returned in January.

In September 2020, McPake joined Greenock Morton on loan until January with an option to extend. On 8 January 2021, McPake joined League Two side Harrogate Town on loan for the remainder of the 2020–21 season. McPake impressed during his loan spell with Harrogate, making 21 appearances for the club.

On 1 July 2021, McPake signed a new contract with Rangers until summer 2024 and immediately joined newly-promoted League One side Morecambe, with a recall option in January 2022.

On 5 January 2022, McPake joined EFL League Two side Tranmere Rovers on loan for the remainder of 2021–22 season.

On 23 July 2022, McPake joined Scottish Championship side Queen's Park on a season-long loan. He would make his debut for the club the same day in a Scottish League Cup group stage game against Hamilton Academical. McPake would net his first and second goals for the Spiders in a thrashing away victory over Partick Thistle in October.

International career
He has played for Scotland at youth level.

Career statistics

Honours
Harrogate Town
FA Trophy: 2019–20

References

2001 births
Living people
Footballers from Coatbridge
Scottish footballers
Association football midfielders
Rangers F.C. players
Dundee F.C. players
Greenock Morton F.C. players
Harrogate Town A.F.C. players
Morecambe F.C. players
Tranmere Rovers F.C. players
Queen's Park F.C. players
Scottish Professional Football League players
English Football League players
Scotland youth international footballers
Scotland under-21 international footballers